John Brown Duffie (October 4, 1945 – April 19, 2018) was a pitcher in Major League Baseball. He was the starting pitcher in two games for the Los Angeles Dodgers during the 1967 MLB season. Duffie died on April 19, 2018, at the age of 72 at Coffee Regional Medical Center following a brief illness.

References

External links

1945 births
2018 deaths
Major League Baseball pitchers
Los Angeles Dodgers players
Brewton–Parker Barons baseball players
Baseball players from South Carolina
Jamestown Dodgers players
Arizona Instructional League Dodgers players
Albuquerque Dodgers players
Spokane Indians players
People from Greenwood, South Carolina